Damian Radowicz (born December 20, 1989, in Łódź) is a Polish footballer who plays for Sokół Aleksandrów Łódzki.

Career

Club
In September 2010, he joined senior team of Widzew Łódź.

References

External links
 

1989 births
Living people
Polish footballers
Widzew Łódź players
Ekstraklasa players
Footballers from Łódź
Association football midfielders